The 1979 NCAA Men's Division I Outdoor Track and Field Championships were contested May 29−June 2 at the 57th annual NCAA-sanctioned track meet to determine the individual and team national champions of men's collegiate Division I outdoor track and field events in the United States. 

This year's meet was contested at Memorial Stadium at the University of Illinois in Champaign, Illinois, who hosted for the second time overall and for the first time since 1977. 

After winning a co-championship in 1978, UTEP easily finished atop this year's team standings and claimed their third national title.

Team result 
 Note: Top 10 only
 (H) = Hosts

References

NCAA Men's Outdoor Track and Field Championship
NCAA Division I Outdoor Track and Field Championships
NCAA
NCAA Division I Outdoor Track and Field Championships
NCAA Division I Outdoor Track and Field Championships